Francisco Javier Barraza Rodríguez, better known as Pancho Barraza, is a Mexican singer-songwriter. He was born on June 18, 1961, in the Juan Jose Rios district of Guasave, Sinaloa. He became involved with Regional Mexican music after moving to Mazatlán. Barraza was first the lead vocalist of a local grupero band and later became involved with the brass bandas, Banda San Sebastian and Banda Camino. In 1991, he joined Banda Los Recoditos as their lead vocalist. He wrote some of the band’s songs while he was with the group. After a few years, Barraza left Banda Los Recoditos to start a solo career. He released his solo debut in 1995 with Mis Canciones De Amor. He has since had a very successful solo career with several of his own songs that he sang, as well as songs he wrote for other artists becoming hits.

See also 
 El Coyote (singer)
 Julio Preciado
 Valentín Elizalde

References 

Year of birth missing (living people)
Living people
Mexican musicians